Lower Celliau, (aka Lower Kathlea/Lower Celli), Llangattock Lingoed, Monmouthshire is a farmhouse dating from the 16th century. It is a Grade II* listed building. The adjacent barn and shelter, and cowhouse and stable have their own Grade II listings.

History and description
The farmhouse at Lower Celliau is a cruck-framed hall house dating from the early to mid-16th century. In the early 1700s, a parlour bay was added. At a slightly later date, a second, almost free-standing, farmstead was constructed; probably an example of the two-unit system identified by Sir Cyril Fox and Lord Raglan, where two residences are built side by side on a single farm. Cadw notes that the doorcases of the linking lobby are identical in style to one found at Howell's House, Grosmont, a few miles to the north. The doorcase at Howell's House is dated 1611, and Cadw suggests this indicates that the lobby at Lower Celliau was contemporaneous with both the second house at Celliau and with Howell's.

Fox and Raglan, who described and illustrated the house in Sub-Medieval Houses, c. 1550–1610, the second volume of their multi-volume study, Monmouthshire Houses, written in the early 1950s, described Lower Celliau as "long-deserted" but noted the quality of the craftsmanship. In the late twentieth century, when the architectural historian John Newman visited while writing his Gwent/Monmouthshire Pevsner, Lower Celliau remained "disused and inaccessible". The farmstead, which is private property, is a Grade II* listed building, its listing record describing it as an "exceptionally well-preserved 16th-century cruck-framed house". The adjacent barn and shelter shed, and cowhouse and stable have their own Grade II designations.

References

Sources
 
 

Grade II* listed buildings in Monmouthshire
Country houses in Wales
Grade II* listed houses in Wales